Mark Kozelek & Desertshore is a collaborative studio album by American singer-songwriter Mark Kozelek and indie rock band Desertshore, released on August 20, 2013 on Caldo Verde Records. The album was Kozelek's third studio album of 2013.

In 2015, the American metal band Cult Leader covered the track "You Are Not of My Blood" for their Useless Animal EP.

Reception

At Metacritic, which assigns a weighted average score out of 100 to reviews and ratings from mainstream critics, the album has received a metascore of 78, based on 6 reviews, indicating "generally favorable reviews."

Track listing

References

2013 albums
Caldo Verde Records albums
Mark Kozelek albums